This page lists the football squads, in order with the gold medallists first, of the 11 participating nations at the men's football tournament at the 1912 Summer Olympics. The tournament was contested in and around Stockholm, Sweden, between 29 June and 6 July 1912.

Great Britain 

Head coach: Arthur Birch

The following players were also named as reserves, but did not play in any matches: Arthur Brown, George Bancroft, Charles Bradley, John Elvey, Wilbur Chapman, Joseph Flavell, Frederick Atkins, Alec Barclay, George How, Frank Monk, William Callaghan, Arthur Smith, Harry Raymond, John Grant, Joe Bailey

Denmark 

Head coach: Louis Østrup

Netherlands 

Head coach:  Edgar Chadwick

Note: Goalkeeper Wiet Ledeboer was injured on 15 Jun and was replaced by Van Eeck. Source: http://kranten.kb.nl , http://leiden.courant.nu/.

Finland 

Head coach: none

Hungary 

Head coach:  Ede Herczog

The following players were also named as reserves, but did not play in any matches: György Hlavay, Károly Kóródy

Austria

Head coach: none ÖFB committee

The following players were also named as reserves, but did not play in any matches: Hans Andres, Adolf Fischera, Richard Kohn, Heinrich Retschury, Jakob Swatosch, Felix Tekusch, Karl Tekusch

Germany

Head coach: none DFB committee

Italy 

Head coach:  Vittorio Pozzo

Four reserve players, although included in the official squad Submitted to FIFA, Did not travel to Sweden and stayed in Italy on reserve.

Sweden 

Head coach: John Ohlson

Norway 

Head coach:  James Vincent Hayes

Russia 

Head coach: Robert Fulda and Georgy Dyuperron

France
France named the following squad, but the team withdrew before the tournament started:

 Gaston Barreau (Defender)/ (Midfield)
 Maurice Bigué (Defender)
 Georges Damois (Defender)
 Jean Ducret (Midfield)
 Alfred Gindrat (Defender)
 Eugène Maës (Forward)
 Louis Mesnier (Forward)
 Maurice Olivier (Forward)
 Paul Romano (Defender)
 Marcel Triboulet (Forward)
 Henri Vialmonteil (Forward)
 Maurice Thiéry (Goalkeeper)
 Paul Fievet (Defender)
 Émilien Devic (Forward)
 Étienne Jourde (Forward)

Footnotes

External links
Games of the V. Olympiad at RSSSF
OG 1912.the list of teams
FIFA
 sports-reference
IFFHS IFFHS (archive)

1912 Summer Olympics
Football at the 1912 Summer Olympics